Jorge Otávio Pinto Pouey de Oliveira (born September 20, 1966), better known by his stage name Frank Jorge, is a Brazilian singer-songwriter, lyricist, multi-instrumentalist, poet, chronicler and professor, famous for his work with pioneering Rio Grande do Sul rock bands Os Cascavelletes and Graforreia Xilarmônica.

Biography
Jorge was born in Porto Alegre, Rio Grande do Sul, on September 20, 1966. His father was a physician from Uruguaiana (who died when Jorge was only 2 years old), and his mother's family came from Santana do Livramento. He also has four sisters and a brother. During his travels abroad his father used to bring home many vinyl records, and his mother was very fond of literature, and on his later life Jorge would be very influenced by both aspects, to the point of graduating in Literature at the PUC-RS in 1992.

He learned how to play the classical guitar in mid-1981, and in 1983 formed his first band, Prisão de Ventre, alongside Luís "Tchê" Gomes (a future member of TNT) and brothers Alexandre and Marcelo Birck. They only recorded two songs before disbanding circa 1985. In 1987 Jorge reunited with the Birck brothers and, alongside Carlo Pianta, formed Graforreia Xilarmônica, which achieved a huge cult following in the mid-1990s with their humorous songs. Around the same time, invited by his childhood friend Alexandre Barea, Jorge was invited to join Os Cascavelletes as bassist; alongside vocalist Flávio Basso he wrote one of their most famous (and controversial) hits, "Menstruada". He left Os Cascavelletes in 1988, after the release of their debut EP, to focus solely on Graforreia Xilarmônica. After releasing two critically acclaimed albums, Coisa de Louco II (1995) and Chapinhas de Ouro (1998), they broke up in 2000. Graforreia Xilarmônica reunited in 2005, and Jorge continues to perform with them since then.

In 1997, alongside Júlio Reny and TNT guitarist Márcio Petracco, he formed the country rock group Cowboys Espirituais, but left them after the release of their first album to focus on more personal projects. He continued to collaborate occasionally with the group though, but didn't officially return to it until 2013.

In 2000 he released his first solo album, Carteira Nacional de Apaixonado, through label Barulhinho. It spawned one of his most memorable songs, "Cabelos Cor de Jambo", included in the soundtrack of Jorge Furtado's 2002 film Houve uma Vez Dois Verões. It was followed by three more albums, Vida de Verdade (2003), Volume 3 (2008) and Escorrega Mil Vai Três Sobra Sete (2016). On December 11, 2017, Jorge released the digital single "Vida na Cidade (Allegro ma non-tanto)", compared favorably by a critic to Chuck Berry's "Roll Over Beethoven" and the songs of Paul McCartney. On April 27, 2018, Jorge released another single, "S.O.S. Maloca", as a teaser to his most recent album, Histórias Excêntricas ou Algum Tipo de Urgência, released on June 1, 2018.

From 2008 to 2010 he was a member of the supergroup Tenente Cascavel, a tribute act to TNT and his former project Os Cascavelletes. In 2018 he returned to the band.

On October 13, 2017, alongside also former Os Cascavelletes member Luciano Albo, Jorge opened a Paul McCartney show in Porto Alegre.

Outside music, Jorge is also known for lecturing about rock music at Unisinos since 2006, and for hosting the radio show Sarau Elétrico on Ipanema FM from the late 1990s until the mid-2000s. He also authored three anthologies of poems and chronicles: Realidades e Chantillys Diversos (2000), Crocâncias Inéditas (2001) and Vida de Verdade (2002; not to be confused with his eponymous album).

Discography

With Os Cascavelletes

With Graforreia Xilarmônica
 For a more comprehensive list, see Graforreia Xilarmônica#Discography

With Cowboys Espirituais

Solo

Bibliography
 Realidades e Chantillys Diversos (Artes e Ofícios, 2000)
 Crocâncias Inéditas (Sagra Luzzatto, 2001)
 Vida de Verdade (Sagra Luzzatto, 2002)

References

External links
 
 
 Frank Jorge on Myspace

1966 births
Living people
Brazilian rock singers
Brazilian rock musicians
Musicians from Rio Grande do Sul
People from Porto Alegre
Brazilian classical guitarists
Brazilian male guitarists
Brazilian keyboardists
Brazilian bass guitarists
Brazilian male poets
20th-century Brazilian poets
21st-century Brazilian poets
20th-century Brazilian male singers
20th-century Brazilian singers
21st-century Brazilian male singers
21st-century Brazilian singers
Pontifical Catholic University of Rio Grande do Sul alumni
20th-century Brazilian male writers
21st-century Brazilian male writers
Male bass guitarists
Brazilian male singer-songwriters